The 159th Massachusetts General Court, consisting of the Massachusetts Senate and the Massachusetts House of Representatives, met in 1955 and 1956 during the governorship of Christian Herter. Richard I. Furbush served as president of the Senate and Michael F. Skerry served as speaker of the House.

The Massachusetts Legislative Research Bureau began operating in 1955.

Senators

Representatives

See also
 84th United States Congress
 List of Massachusetts General Courts

References

Further reading

External links
 Photo of William Randolph Hearst Jr. speaking to members of the legislature, March 31, 1955
 
 
 
 

Political history of Massachusetts
Massachusetts legislative sessions
massachusetts
1955 in Massachusetts
massachusetts
1956 in Massachusetts